Tamer Dağlı (born 5 June 1970) is a Turkish politician from the Justice and Development Party (AK Party), who has served as a Member of Parliament for Adana since 1 November 2015, 2018.

Biography 
Tamer Dağlı was born in Kozan, Adana Province, on 5 June 1970 to Hasan and his wife Gülcan. He completed his primary, secondary, and high school education in Adana. Dağlı graduated from Ankara University Faculty of Political Sciences in 1990. He was elected as an AK Party Member of Parliament for Adana in the November 2015 general election.

Dağlı is married, and has three children.

References 

1970 births
Living people
Ankara University Faculty of Political Sciences alumni
Justice and Development Party (Turkey) politicians
Members of the Grand National Assembly of Turkey